Malta participated in the Eurovision Song Contest 2010 with the song "My Dream" written by Jason Cassar and Sunny Aquilina. The song was performed by Thea Garrett. The Maltese entry for the 2010 contest in Oslo, Norway was selected through the national final The GO Malta Eurosong 2010, organised by the Maltese broadcaster Public Broadcasting Services (PBS). The competition consisted of a semi-final round and a final, held between 9 December 2009 and 20 February 2010, where "My Dream" performed by Thea Garrett eventually emerged as the winning entry after scoring the most points from a five-member jury and a public televote.

Malta was drawn to compete in the first semi-final of the Eurovision Song Contest which took place on 25 May 2010. Performing during the show in position 11, "My Dream" was not announced among the top 10 entries of the first semi-final and therefore did not qualify to compete in the final on 29 May. It was later revealed that Malta placed twelfth out of the 17 participating countries in the semi-final with 45 points.

Background 

Prior to the 2010 contest, Malta had participated in the Eurovision Song Contest twenty-two times since its first entry in 1971. Malta briefly competed in the Eurovision Song Contest in the 1970s before withdrawing for sixteen years. The country had, to this point, competed in every contest since returning in 1991. Malta's best placing in the contest thus far was second, which it achieved on two occasions: in 2002 with the song "7th Wonder" performed by Ira Losco and in the 2005 contest with the song "Angel" performed by Chiara. In the 2009 edition, Malta qualified to the final and placed 22nd with the song "What If We" performed by Chiara.

For the 2010 contest, the Maltese national broadcaster, Public Broadcasting Services (PBS), broadcast the event within Malta and organised the selection process for the nation's entry. PBS confirmed their intentions to participate at it on 9 September 2009. Malta selected their entry consistently through a national final procedure, a method that was continued for their 2010 participation.

Before Eurovision

The GO Malta Eurosong 2010
The GO Malta Eurosong 2010 was the national final format developed by PBS to select the Maltese entry for the Eurovision Song Contest 2010. The competition consisted of a semi-final held between 8 December 2009 and 13 January 2010, and a final held on 20 February 2010. The semi-final took place at the Audiovision TV Studios in Hamrun and hosted by former Maltese Eurovision entrant Claudette Pace who represented Malta in 2000, while the final took place at the Malta Fairs & Convention Centre in Ta' Qali and hosted by Keith Demicoli and Pauline Agius with backstage commentary and interviews by Owen Bonnici. All shows were broadcast on Television Malta (TVM), while the final was also broadcast on the official Eurovision Song Contest website eurovision.tv.

Format 
The competition consisted of thirty-six songs competing in the semi-final which consisted of six shows with six songs each between 8 December 2009 and 13 January 2010, broadcast during the TVM talent show L-Isfida. The first show was initially scheduled to take place on 9 November 2009, but was delayed due to legal disputes between PBS and former chairwoman of the Maltese Eurovision selection Grace Borg regarding the prohibition of submissions from foreign songwriters. The top twenty entries qualified to compete in the final on 20 February 2010. Five judges evaluated the songs during the shows and each judge had an equal stake in the final result. In the semi-final, an additional two set of votes were the results of the votes submitted by the public via telephone and SMS, each having a weighting equal to the votes of a single judge. In the final, the results of the public televote had a weighting equal to the total votes of the judges.

Competing entries 
Artists and composers were able to submit their entries between 1 and 30 October 2009. Both artists and songwriters were required to be Maltese or possess Maltese citizenship. Songwriters were able to submit as many songs as they wished, however, artists were only able to submit a maximum of one song. 123 entries were received by the broadcaster. The thirty-six songs selected to compete in the semi-final were announced on 4 December 2009.

Among the selected competing artists was former Maltese Eurovision entrant Mike Spiteri who represented Malta in 1995 and Miriam Christine who represented Malta in 1996. Among the songwriters, Aldo Spiteri, Alfred C. Sant, Jason Paul Cassar, Paul Abela, Ray Agius, Sunny Aquilina, Gerard James Borg and Philip Vella were all past writers of Maltese Eurovision entries. Paul Giordimaina represented Malta in the 1991 edition.

Shows

Semi-final
The semi-final phase took place over six shows between 9 December 2009 and 13 January 2010. Thirty-six songs competed for twenty qualifying spots in the final, which were announced on 16 January 2010. The allocation of the six entries competing in each show was announced on 8 December 2009.

Final
The final took place on 20 February 2010. The twenty entries that qualified from the semi-final were performed again and the 50/50 combination of votes of a five-member jury panel and the results of public televoting determined the winner. The show was opened with a guest performance of "What If We" performed by 1998, 2005 and 2009 Maltese Eurovision entrant Chiara, while the interval act featured performances by 1992 Maltese Eurovision entrant Mary Spiteri, 2008 Armenian Eurovision entrant Sirusho, the Dancel Dance Studio dance troupe and the local bands Chasing Pandora and Winter Moods. After the votes from the jury panel and televote were combined, "My Dream" performed by Thea Garrett was the winner.

Promotion
Thea Garrett made several appearances across Europe to specifically promote "My Dream" as the Maltese Eurovision entry. On 15 April, Garrett took part in promotional activities in Slovakia and performed during the Eurovision in Concert event, which was held at the Lexion venue in Zaanstad, Netherlands on 24 April and hosted by Cornald Maas and Marga Bult. On 30 April, she appeared during the TV Limburg talk show Studio TVL and performed during the Pink Nation event which was held in Antwerp, Belgium. In addition to her international appearances, Thea Garrett also completed promotional activities in Malta where she appeared during the TVM talk show programme Xarabank on 21 May and performed the Maltese version of "My Dream", entitled "Ħolma".

At Eurovision

The Eurovision Song Contest 2010 took place at the Telenor Arena in Oslo, Norway and consisted of two semi-finals on 25 and 27 May, and the final of 29 May 2010. According to Eurovision rules, all nations with the exceptions of the host country and the "Big Four" (France, Germany, Spain and the United Kingdom) are required to qualify from one of two semi-finals in order to compete for the final; the top ten countries from each semi-final progress to the final. The European Broadcasting Union (EBU) split up the competing countries into six different pots based on voting patterns from previous contests, with countries with favourable voting histories put into the same pot. On 7 February 2010, a special allocation draw was held which placed each country into one of the two semi-finals, as well as which half of the show they would perform in. Malta was placed into the first semi-final, to be held on 25 May 2010, and was scheduled to perform in the second half of the show. The running order for the semi-finals was decided through another draw on 15 March 2011 and Malta was set to perform in position 11, following the entry from Belgium and before the entry from Albania.

The two semi-finals and the final were broadcast in Malta on TVM with commentary by Valerie Vella. The Maltese spokesperson, who announced the Maltese votes during the final, was previous 1998, 2005 and 2009 contest entrant Chiara Siracusa.

Semi-final 
Thea Garrett took part in technical rehearsals on 17 and 20 May, followed by dress rehearsals on 24 and 25 May. This included the jury show on 24 May where the professional juries of each country watched and voted on the competing entries.

The Maltese performance featured Thea Garrett wearing a grey and silver dress and performing together with three backing vocalists and one dancer dressed as a bird with a pair of white wings. In regards to the dancer, Garrett stated: "He is dressed as a seagull, as the seagull is one of the few birds that whatever comes his way, he still flies, and that's the message of the song. When you have a dream, no matter what comes for your way still reach for your dream." The performance began with the dancer gyrating around and moving his wings, and dancing behind Garrett towards the latter part of the song. The stage backdrop transitioned between dark colours to blue, white and black with spotlights beaming down onto the performers. The performance also utilised pyrotechnics and smoke effects. The backing vocalists that joined Thea Garrett on stage were Jes Sciberras, Nadine Axisa and Pamela Bezzina. The dancer featured during the performance was Jackie Pace Delicata.

At the end of the show, Malta was not announced among the top 10 entries in the first semi-final and therefore failed to qualify to compete in the final. It was later revealed that Malta placed twelfth in the semi-final, receiving a total of 45 points.

Voting 
Voting during the three shows involved each country awarding points from 1-8, 10 and 12 as determined by a combination of 50% national jury and 50% televoting. Each nation's jury consisted of five music industry professionals who are citizens of the country they represent. This jury judged each entry based on: vocal capacity; the stage performance; the song's composition and originality; and the overall impression by the act. In addition, no member of a national jury was permitted to be related in any way to any of the competing acts in such a way that they cannot vote impartially and independently.

Following the release of the full split voting by the EBU after the conclusion of the competition, it was revealed that Malta had placed twelfth with the public televote and seventh with the jury vote in the first semi-final. In the public vote, Malta scored 40 points, while with the jury vote, Malta scored 66 points.

Below is a breakdown of points awarded to Malta and awarded by Malta in the second semi-final and grand final of the contest. The nation awarded its 12 points to Croatia in the semi-final and to Azerbaijan in the final of the contest.

Points awarded to Malta

Points awarded by Malta

References

External links
 Regulations of Eurosong 2010 PBS
 Malta Eurosong 2010 - 36 Finalists PBS

2010
Countries in the Eurovision Song Contest 2010
Eurovision